Kari Uglem (born 16 May 1970) is a retired Norwegian cross-country skier.

In the World Cup she finished once among the top 10, with a tenth place from Lahti in January 1995. She made her debut in January 1993 and competed in her last World Cup race in January 1996.

She also competed on national level in middle distance running, winning the Norwegian championships in 800 metres in 1992 and 1996. Her personal best time was 2:04.36 minutes, achieved in August 1992 in Mosjøen.

As a cross-country skier she represented Strindheim IL. As a runner she represented Strindheim IL and later Oppdal FIK.

Cross-country skiing results
All results are sourced from the International Ski Federation (FIS).

World Cup

Season standings

Team podiums

 1 podium

References

External links

1970 births
Living people
Norwegian female cross-country skiers
Norwegian female middle-distance runners
20th-century Norwegian women
21st-century Norwegian women